Djamel Keddou (January 30, 1952 – November 16, 2011) was an Algerian football player and manager. He spent his entire playing career with USM Alger and had 25 caps for the Algeria national football team, winning a gold medal at the 1975 Mediterranean Games in Algiers. As a manager, he led USM Alger to the Algerian Cup in 1988, beating rivals CR Belouizdad in the final. Keddou also managed Algerian clubs JS El Biar and ES Ben Aknoun.

On November 16, 2011, Keddou died after suffering a heart attack.
He is buried at the El Kettar Cemetery.

Honours

Player
 Won the 1975 Mediterranean Games
 Won the Algerian Cup once with USM Alger in 1981

Manager
 Won the Algerian Cup once with USM Alger in 1988

References

External links

1952 births
2011 deaths
Algeria international footballers
Algerian footballers
Algerian football managers
USM Alger players
USM Alger managers
People from Bab El Oued
Mediterranean Games gold medalists for Algeria
Competitors at the 1975 Mediterranean Games
Association football defenders
Mediterranean Games medalists in football
21st-century Algerian people
African Games gold medalists for Algeria
African Games medalists in football
Competitors at the 1978 All-Africa Games